Hysterical strength refers to a display of extreme physical strength by humans, beyond what is believed to be normal, usually occurring when people are in, or perceive themselves to be in life-or-death situations. It was also reported to be present during situations of altered states of consciousness, such as trance and alleged possession. Its description is mostly based on anecdotal evidence.

The name refers to hysteria, a nosological category that included bouts of superhuman strength as one of the possible symptoms, but in Europe this had also been an attribution in previous cases of alleged demonic possession. Charcot imputed to the phase of hysterical attacks called clownism the presence of strength and agility not consistent with the age and sex of the person, which before in the Catholic ritual of exorcism was attributed to demonic force. Thus, the cause of the phenomenon began at that time to be addressed by the investigation of insanity. During that period in the 19th century, the term hysterical strength could also be found in the intersection of such fields, scientific and religious, for instance appearing in a statement by a physician for the Society for Psychical Research.

It was also described in reports of trance or possession in several other cultures, as for example in the New Testament (Mark 5:4) or in shamanic practices.

Unexpected strength is claimed to occur during excited delirium.

Examples
The most common anecdotal examples based on hearsay are of parents lifting vehicles to rescue their children, and when people are in life-and-death situations. Periods of increased strength are short-lived, usually no longer than a few minutes, and might lead to muscle injuries and exhaustion later. It is not known if there are any reliable examples of this phenomenon.

Tibetan oracles, such as the Nechung Kuten or Sungma Balung, are reported to display superhuman strength during possession. Eyewitnesses described the Nechung Oracle wearing a 80 or 90 pounds headdress, that normally outside the trance could break his neck. The 14th Dalai Lama also stated that the oracle could barely walk with the total weight of his outfit (70 pounds) when not in trance. 
Before May 1962, Jack Kirby claims a woman lifted a car off her baby, which inspired him to create the Hulk.
In 1982, in Lawrenceville, Georgia, Tony Cavallo was repairing a 1964 Chevrolet Impala automobile from underneath when the vehicle fell off the jacks on which it was propped, trapping him underneath. Cavallo's mother, Mrs. Angela Cavallo, lifted the car high enough and long enough for two neighbors to replace the jacks and pull Tony from beneath the car.
 In 1988, in Waialua, Hawaii, while working a construction contract two weeks after filming the finale for the television show Magnum P.I., pilot and Vietnam Veteran Steve Kux lost control of his Hughes 500D helicopter and crashed into a drainage ditch. His coworker, Warren Everal (also known as "Tiny") lifted the 1,400 pound helicopter enough to allow another person to remove Kux from the cockpit. 
 In 2006, Ivujivik, Quebec, resident Lydia Angiyou saved several children by fighting a polar bear until a local hunter shot the bear.
In 2006, in Tucson, Arizona, Tom Boyle watched as a Chevrolet Camaro hit 18-year-old Kyle Holtrust. The car pinned Holtrust, still alive, underneath. Boyle lifted the Camaro off the teenager, while the driver of the car pulled the teen to safety.
In 2009, in Ottawa, Kansas,  Nick Harris lifted a Mercury sedan to help a 6-year-old girl pinned beneath.
In 2009, in Newport, Wales, Donna McNamee, Abigail Sicolo, and Anthony McNamee lifted a 1.1 ton Renault Clio off an 8-year-old boy.
In 2011, in Tampa, Florida,  University of South Florida college football player Danous Estenor lifted a  car off a man who had been caught underneath. The man was a tow truck driver who had been pinned under the rear tire of a 1990 Cadillac Seville, which had lurched forward as he worked underneath it. The man suffered only minor injuries.
In 2012, in Glen Allen, Virginia, 22-year-old Lauren Kornacki rescued her father, Alec Kornacki, after the jack used to prop up his BMW slipped, pinning him under it. Lauren lifted the car, then performed CPR on her father and saved his life.
In 2012, in Michigan, Austin Smith (age 15) lifted a car to save his grandfather pinned underneath.
In 2013, in Oregon, teenage sisters Hannah (age 16) and Haylee (age 14) lifted a tractor to save their father pinned underneath.
In 2013, in Salvage, Newfoundland and Labrador, Cecil Stuckless, a 72-year-old man lifted a Jeep to save his son-in-law pinned underneath.
In 2015, in St. John's, Newfoundland, Nick Williams lifted a four-wheel-drive vehicle to save a young boy pinned beneath its tire.
In 2017, in Temple Terrace, Florida, Kenny Franklin, lifted an SUV from a state trooper after an accident.
In 2019, in Ohio, Zac Clark, a 16-year-old football player, lifted a 3,000 lb car when he heard his neighbor call for help.

Research

Early experiments showed that adrenaline increases twitch, but not tetanic force and rate of force development in muscles.

One proposed explanation is Tim Noakes' "central governor" theory, which states that higher instances in the central nervous system dynamically and subconsciously control the number of active motor units in the muscle. Normally, in order to guarantee homeostasis, the entire motor neural capacity is not activated and, therefore, the total capacity of the muscle during performances outside of an emergency situation remains inaccessible: this would lead to exhaustion of energy resources and even physical injuries. However, in life-threatening situations, it is adaptive for the central governor limits to be removed or modified. People in high load weightlifting training are able to activate more motor units, which ensures more strength and efficiency in muscle contraction, even though they had the same amount of muscle mass compared to people in low load training.

Exercise physiologist Robert Girandola has pointed out that most cars have a 60/40 weight distribution, as the engine block puts the center of mass slightly towards the front of the car. In most instances, the individual is lifting one or two wheels of the car from the back. Therefore, they are only actually lifting a small fraction of the vehicle's weight. While the fight or flight response allows for increased lifting capacity, it would be hundreds of pounds rather than thousands.

See also
 Berserker
 Furor Teutonicus
 Double-muscle mutation in humans
 Myostatin-related muscle hypertrophy, a rare genetic condition resulting in increased musculature and decreased body fat
 Muscle hypertrophy
 Superhuman strength, similar concept in comic books and other fictional characters
Physical strength

References

Muscular system
Exercise physiology
Demonic possession